Cotton Green (station code: CTGN) is a railway station on the Harbour Line of the Mumbai Suburban Railway. The track passes under a road connecting both sides of the station platform.

The railway station caters to Kalachowki, Ferbandar and Ghodapdeo.

Mumbai Suburban Railway stations
Railway stations in Mumbai City district
Mumbai CR railway division